This list of hospitals in Azerbaijan includes notable hospitals in Azerbaijan.
Bona Dea International Hospital, Baku, Azerbaijan
Ganja International Hospital, Ganja, Azerbaijan
Republican Treatment and Diagnostic Center, Baku
Shusha Hospital, Shusha

References

Azerbaijan
 List
Hospitals
Azerbaijan
Azerbaijan